The Lviv palace of Prince Stanisław Lubomirski was built in the 1760s to Jan de Witte's design on the site of several older houses (one of which had been the property of Szymon Szymonowic). The palace's main façade, featuring decoration by Sebastian Vessinger, is on the Market Square. The two other fronts are considerably less conspicuous.

Between 1771 and 1821, the Lubomirski Palace served as the residence for Austrian governors of Galicia. It was purchased by a Ukrainian organization, Prosvita, in the 19th century and subsequently became a hotbed of nationalist activities. It was there that Yaroslav Stetsko proclaimed Ukraine's independence several days after Nazi Germany's invasion of the Soviet Union.

Next door to the Lubomirski Palace is the former palace of the Roman Catholic archbishops where King Michał Korybut Wiśniowiecki died in 1673.

References 
 Вуйцик В. С., Липка Р. М. Зустріч зі Львовом. Львів: Каменяр, 1987. С. 54.
 Памятники градостроительства и архитектуры Украинской ССР. Киев: Будивельник, 1983–1986. Том 3, с. 42.
 Трегубова Т. О., Мих Р. М. Львів: Архітектурно-історичний нарис. Київ: Будівельник. С. 70.

External links 

Buildings and structures in Lviv
Lubomirski family
Baroque palaces in Ukraine
Prosvita